The 2014–15 Montana State Bobcats men's basketball team represented Montana State University during the 2014–15 NCAA Division I men's basketball season. The Bobcats, led by first year head coach Brian Fish, played their home games at Worthington Arena and were members of the Big Sky Conference. They finished the season 7–23, 4–14 in Big Sky play to finish in a three way tie for tenth place. They failed to qualify for the Big Sky tournament.

Roster

Schedule

|-
!colspan=9 style="background:#0a1f62; color:#c1b465;"| Exhibition

|-
!colspan=9 style="background:#0a1f62; color:#c1b465;"|  Regular Season

See also
2014–15 Montana State Bobcats women's basketball team

References

Montana State Bobcats men's basketball seasons
Montana State
Bob
Bob